Liparis reflexa, commonly known as tom cats, onion orchid or dog orchid, is a plant in the orchid family and is endemic to New South Wales. It is a lithophytic orchid with up to four leaves and up to thirty or more yellowish green flowers which smell like urine. It grows on rocks, sometimes on the ground, in moist forests.

Description 
The flowers smell like urine or a wet dog. Flowering occurs between February and June.

Taxonomy and naming
Tom cats was first formally described in 1810 by Robert Brown who gave it the name Cymbidium reflexum and published the description in Prodromus Florae Novae Hollandiae et Insulae Van Diemen. In 1825, John Lindley changed the name to Liparis reflexa. The specific epithet (reflexa) is a Latin word meaning "bent" or "turned back".

Distribution and habitat
Liparis reflexa usually grows on rocks, including on escarpments and boulders in gorges and only rarely on trees. It is found between the Clyde River, Hastings River and Hunter River valleys.

References 

reflexa
Orchids of New South Wales
Endemic orchids of Australia
Plants described in 1810